Banshilal Mahto (30 June 1940 – 23 November 2019) was an Indian politician and a member of parliament to the 16th Lok Sabha from Korba (Lok Sabha constituency), Chhattisgarh. He won the 2014 Indian general election being a Bharatiya Janata Party candidate.

References

1940 births
2019 deaths
India MPs 2014–2019
People from Korba district
Lok Sabha members from Chhattisgarh
Place of birth missing
Bharatiya Janata Party politicians from Chhattisgarh